Aegisub is a subtitle editing application. It is the main tool of fansubbing, the practice of creating or translating unofficial subtitles for visual media by fans. It is the successor of the original SubStation Alpha and Sabbu.

Aegisub's design emphasizes on timing, styling of subtitles, and the creation of karaoke. It allows for many video processing bindings to process the timing, such as FFmpeg and Avisynth. It can also be extended with the Lua and MoonScript scripting languages. 

The app's native subtitle format is Advanced SubStation Alpha, which supports subtitle positioning and styling. Aegisub can export subtitles to other common formats, such as SubRip's ".srt" format, but at the cost losing all features save the raw text and basic timing.

In fansubbing, Aegisub is used for translating, timing, editing, typesetting, quality checking, karaoke timing and karaoke effecting. Many groups use different tools for some of those steps, however, such as Adobe After Effects for typesetting, or a simple text editor for translation.

See also
 Comparison of subtitle editors
 List of free television software

References

External links 
 
 
 
 Aegisub IRC channel on Rizon.net
 
 

Subtitling
Free television software
Translation software
Lua (programming language)-scriptable software
Software that uses wxWidgets
Software that uses Scintilla